The National Athletic Association of Schools, Colleges and Universities (NAASCU) is an athletic association of colleges and universities in the Philippines. It was established in 2001.

NAASCU sports are men's, women's and junior's basketball, men's and women's volleyball, track and field, table tennis, chess, taekwondo, swimming, billiards, badminton, beach handball, street dance and cheerdance.

Member schools

Former members
left in 2002
Our Lady of Lourdes Technological Institute (OLLTI Saints), Quezon City
left in 2003
Arellano University (AU Flaming Arrows/Chiefs), Manila
Angeles University Foundation (AUF Great Danes), Pampanga
Las Piñas College (LPC Blue Lions), Las Piñas
left in 2004
World Citi Colleges (WCC Vikings), Quezon City
left in 2011
San Sebastian College - Recoletos de Cavite (SSC-RC Baycats), Cavite
left in 2012
Informatics International University (IIU Icons), Quezon City
University of Manila (UM Hawks), Manila
left in 2013
STI College (STI Olympians), Manila
Trace College (TC Stallions), Los Baños, Laguna
left in 2015
Central Colleges of the Philippines (CCP Bobcats), Quezon City
Diliman College (Diliman College Senators/Blue Dragons), Quezon City
Polytechnic University of the Philippines (PUP Mighty Maroons), Manila
Santa Isabel College (Santa Isabel Isabelans), Taft Ave., Manila
University of Makati (UMak Hardy Herons), Makati
left in 2016
Centro Escolar University (CEU Scorpions), Mendiola, Manila
left in 2017
Eulogio "Amang" Rodriguez Institute of Science and Technology (EARIST Red Fox), Sampaloc, Manila
left in 2018
Colegio De San Lorenzo (CDSL Griffins), Quezon City
Lyceum of Subic Bay (LSB Sharks), Olongapo
left in 2019
De Ocampo Memorial College (DOMC Cobras), Sta. Mesa, Manila
National Teachers College (NTC Bearers), Quiapo, Manila
Rizal Technological University (RTU Blue Thunder), Mandaluyong

Membership timeline

References

External links
NAASCU 
NAASCU at Wordpress

Student sport in the Philippines
Sports leagues established in 2001
2001 establishments in the Philippines